En with macron (Н̄) is a letter of the Cyrillic script. It was formerly used in the alphabet of the Altai language.